The Secret Courier (German: Der geheime Kurier) is a 1928 German silent adventure film directed by Gennaro Righelli and starring Lil Dagover, Ivan Mozzhukhin and Agnes Petersen. It is based on the classic novel The Red and the Black by Stendhal, which Righelli later remade as a sound film The Courier of the King in 1947. The film was shot at the Terra Studios in Berlin. The film's art direction was by Otto Erdmann and Hans Sohnle.

Cast
 Lil Dagover as Mme. Thérèse de Renal
 Ivan Mozzhukhin as Julien Sorel
 Agnes Petersen as Mathilde de la Môle
 Félix de Pomés as Norbert de la Môle
 Valeria Blanka as Innkeeper's Daughter
 Hubert von Meyerinck as Duc d'Orléans
 José Davert as Mayor Rénal
 Jean Dax as Marquis de la Môle
 Dillo Lombardi as Abbé

References

Bibliography
 Hans-Michael Bock and Tim Bergfelder. The Concise Cinegraph: An Encyclopedia of German Cinema''. Berghahn Books, 2009.

External links

1928 films
Films of the Weimar Republic
German silent feature films
Films directed by Gennaro Righelli
1920s historical adventure films
German historical adventure films
Films set in France
Films set in the 1820s
Films based on French novels
Films based on works by Stendhal
Terra Film films
German black-and-white films
Silent historical adventure films
Films shot at Terra Studios
1920s German films
1920s German-language films